Steve "Chugger" Dietrich (born February 18, 1970 in Kitchener, Ontario) is the General Manager of the Buffalo Bandits of the National Lacrosse League. Dietrich is also a NLL Hall of Fame goaltender who has played with the Calgary Roughnecks, Buffalo Bandits, Rochester Knighthawks, Detroit Turbos, Baltimore Thunder, and Toronto Rock.

Professional career
Dietrich played six seasons with each of the Bandits and Knighthawks. He led the Bandits to the NLL Championship game twice, in 2004 and 2006, and also won the Championship with the Knighthawks in 1997, when he was named Championship game MVP. He was named NLL Goaltender of the Year in both 2005 and 2006, and was the first goaltender to be named NLL MVP in 2006.

On November 22, 2010, Dietrich announced his retirement as a player in the NLL to become the Toronto Rock's goaltending coach.

In July 2012, Dietrich was announced as the new General Manager of the Buffalo Bandits, after Darris Kilgour was relieved of that title earlier in the month.

On July 30, 2012, Dietrich was elected in the NLL Hall of Fame. Dietrich was the leading vote-getter, appearing on 79% of all ballots cast. The induction ceremony was held on October 2, 2012.

Statistics

NLL
Reference:

Awards

References

1970 births
Living people
Buffalo Bandits players
Calgary Roughnecks players
Canadian expatriate lacrosse people in the United States
Canadian lacrosse players
Canadian people of German descent
Lacrosse goaltenders
Lacrosse people from Ontario
National Lacrosse League All-Stars
National Lacrosse League major award winners
Rochester Knighthawks players
Sportspeople from Kitchener, Ontario
Toronto Rock players